Stare Biskupice is a village in the administrative district of Gmina Słubice, within Słubice County, Lubusz Voivodeship, in western Poland, close to the German border.

The village has a population of 100.

References 

Villages in Słubice County